Rhynchosia viscosa is a species of flowering plant in the legume family, found in altitudes ranging from 0 to 500 meters in dry climates.

Distribution
Comoros, Madagascar, Mascarenes, Africa and Asia.

References

viscosa